Marius Walter (Maik Walter né Marian Walter, 5 May 1925 – 2 February 2020) was a French footballer of Polish descents. He played in two matches for the France national football team in 1949 and 1950. He was also named in France's squad for the Group 3 qualification tournament for the 1950 FIFA World Cup.

References

1925 births
2020 deaths
French footballers
France international footballers
Association football wingers
French people of Polish descent
Sportspeople from Pas-de-Calais
Lille OSC players
Le Havre AC players
AS Monaco FC players
Angers SCO players
CS Sedan Ardennes players
US Boulogne players
Ligue 1 players
Ligue 2 players
Footballers from Hauts-de-France